Harrie Brigham Chase (August 9, 1889 – November 17, 1969) was an American lawyer and judge. He served briefly on the Supreme Court of Vermont, and then was a United States circuit judge of the United States Court of Appeals for the Second Circuit.

Education and career

Chase was born in Whitingham, Vermont on August 9, 1889. He attended Whitingham public schools, Wilmington High School, and Phillips Exeter Academy. He attended Dartmouth College, receiving an Artium Baccalaureus degree in 1909, and the Boston University School of Law, receiving a Bachelor of Laws in 1912. Admitted to the Vermont bar in 1912, he formed a partnership with his father in October of that year and continued to practice law until 1919 From February 1, 1919 to June 1919, he served as state's attorney of Windham County, Vermont.

State judicial service

Governor Percival W. Clement appointed him a superior court judge on May 16, 1919; at age 29, Chase was one of the youngest individuals in the state to become a judge. He served as a superior court judge until 1927, and was chief judge from 1926 to 1927. In 1927, he succeeded Frank L. Fish as an associate justice of the Supreme Court of Vermont, and served until 1929. He was succeeded on the Vermont Supreme Court by Julius A. Willcox.

Federal judicial service

Chase was nominated by President Calvin Coolidge (a native Vermonter) on January 19, 1929, to the United States Court of Appeals for the Second Circuit, to a new seat authorized by 45 Stat. 1081. Chase's nomination disappointed Learned Hand and other advocates for the promotion of Thomas D. Thacher from the United States District Court for the Southern District of New York; Thacher went on to serve as Solicitor General of the United States. Chase was confirmed by the United States Senate on January 31, 1929, and received his commission the same day. He primarily worked out of his chambers in Brattleboro, Vermont, where he lived, and commuted to New York only when necessary, which meant that he never became part of the core of the court. He served as Chief Judge and as a member of the Judicial Conference of the United States from 1953 to 1954. He assumed senior status on September 1, 1954, and heard very few cases after the mid-1950s. He was succeeded by Sterry R. Waterman, also of Vermont. His service terminated on November 17, 1969, due to his death.

Judicial demeanor and philosophy

Gerald Gunther, a Learned Hand biographer, described Chase as a modest man who "never claimed to be an intellectual or a penetrating student of the law... preferring his outings on the golf course to his struggles with arguments and judicial opinions," and yet had "integrity and competence" and was not a "political judge preoccupied with cronyism" as colleague Martin Thomas Manton was. (Manton resigned in the midst of corruption allegations in 1939 and served time in prison for accepting bribes.) Chase was considered a conservative member of the Second Circuit bench and is remembered today primarily in connection with his colleagues, including Hand.

Notable law clerk

Among Chase's law clerks was James L. Oakes, who later himself became a Second Circuit judge.

Death

Chase died in Vernon, Vermont on November 17, 1969. He was buried at Morningside Cemetery in Brattleboro.

Family

Chase, a Republican, was a Universalist in religion. He was the son of attorney Charles Sumner Chase and Carrie (Brigham) Chase, and his siblings included Paul A. Chase, who served as an associate justice of the Vermont Supreme Court. He married Mina A. Gilman of Brattleboro in 1912, and they had three children.

References

External links

1889 births
1969 deaths
People from Whitingham, Vermont
Vermont Republicans
Vermont lawyers
State's attorneys in Vermont
Judges of the United States Court of Appeals for the Second Circuit
United States court of appeals judges appointed by Calvin Coolidge
20th-century American judges
Vermont state court judges
Justices of the Vermont Supreme Court
Dartmouth College alumni
Boston University School of Law alumni
Burials in Vermont